Oas, officially the Municipality of Oas, is a 1st class municipality in the province of Albay, Philippines. According to the 2020 census, it has a population of 66,084 people.

Etymology

There are two stories that purport to tell the origin of the name of Oas:

a) There is a dam across the narrowest portion of a local river. This dam solely irrigates the vast fields of the place including those of the nearby town of Libon and results in a good harvest. People are wary of any cracks or leaks on the dam walls during months of heavy rains. A crier would shout nawaswas, giving the call to the people (in times of this kind of emergency) for immediate action in groups. From then on, the natives coined this name to the place and later shortened it to present form.

b) Early Spanish colonizers reaching this particular section of the Bicol Peninsula asked the name of the place from the about 600 natives living there, "Como se llama este sitio?" The natives mistakenly thought the question to be "Onan kading lugar kadi, maiwas?" ("What place is this, it's very big?") in their native dialect. In response, the natives answered, "Si, señores. Labi nikading iwas. Labi nikading iwas." ("Yes, sirs, this is grand and spacious".) From then on the early Spanish colonizers adopted in their official census the existence of "a rich fertile valley with verdant fields of grain" which is the little town of Oas in Bicol.

History

Oas was founded during the early Spanish colonization of the Bicol Peninsula. In 1605, Father Baltazar de los Reyes converted 12 leading natives of the area to Christianity in one day, forming the foundation of the community now known as Oas.

Geography

According to the Philippine Statistics Authority, the municipality has a land area of  constituting  of the  total area of Albay.

Barangays
Oas is politically subdivided into 53 barangays.

Climate

Demographics

In the 2020 census, Oas had a population of 66,084.

Economy

Government

Sangguniang Bayan
 Vice Mayor: Hector R. Loyola
 Members Councilor

 Atty. Sharon R. Escoto
 Henry R. Raposon
 Arvin Gregg R. Ricarte
 Noel D. Briuega
 Leopoldo R. Zaragoza
 Robert N. Arevalo
 Gader Rellama
 Jesus Boy Reario
 Joseph Rentosa (Liga ng Barangay President)
 Jessie James Lo Reario (SK PRESIDENT)

Notable personalities

David Nepomuceno, 1924 Olympian, first Filipino to compete in the Olympics 
Catriona Gray, Miss Universe 2018

References

External links
[ Philippine Standard Geographic Code]
Municipality of Oas

Municipalities of Albay